Christer Kleiven (born 9 April 1988) is a Norwegian midfielder who currently plays for Vigør in the 3. divisjon.

Club career

FK Vigør
As a youth player Kleiven played for Vigør.

IK Start
He made his debut for Start in 2007, playing in Adeccoligaen. He made 35 appearances and scored 3 goals that season.

Christer Kleiven had a good start in Tippeligaen 2010. Having scored no goals for IK Start in Tippeligaen, he started the season off with 5 goals in 5 matches.

Stabæk Fotball
Before the 2012 season, Christer Kleiven signed a contract with Norwegian Premier League club Stabæk.

Odd
Before the 2013-season, Christer Kleiven signed a contract with Odd after one season at Stabæk.

Career statistics

References

External links
Bio at ikstart.no

1988 births
Living people
Sportspeople from Kristiansand
Norwegian footballers
IK Start players
Stabæk Fotball players
Odds BK players
Eliteserien players
Norwegian First Division players

Association football midfielders